Dand may refer to:
Hindu push-up, a type of push-up that is also called a Dand
Dand, Manitoba, Canada
Dand District, Afghanistan
Dan-D, rapper

People with the surname
Dhairya Dand, American inventor and artist
Manilal Dand, Indian businessman